Filatima is a genus of moths in the family Gelechiidae.

Biology
In November 2005, an infestation of Filatima caterpillars was found to be stunting the revegetation activity of land destroyed by the eruption of Mount St. Helens in Washington.

Species
Filatima abactella (Clarke, 1932)
Filatima adamsi Hodges & Adamski, 1997
Filatima albicostella Clarke, 1942
Filatima albilorella (Zeller, 1873)
Filatima albipectus (Walsingham, 1911)
Filatima angustipennis Sattler, 1961
Filatima arizonella (Busck, 1903)
Filatima asiatica Sattler, 1961
Filatima aulaea (Clarke, 1932)
Filatima autocrossa (Meyrick, 1937)
Filatima betulae Clarke, 1947
Filatima biforella (Busck, 1909)
Filatima bigella (Busck, 1913)
Filatima biminimaculella (Chambers, 1880)
Filatima catacrossa (Meyrick, 1927)
Filatima collinearis (Meyrick, 1927)
Filatima confusatella (Darlington, 1949)
Filatima cushmani Clarke, 1942
Filatima demissae (Keifer, 1931)
Filatima depuratella (Busck, 1910)
Filatima djakovica Anikin & Piskunov, 1996
Filatima epulatrix Hodges, 1969
Filatima fontisella Lvovsky & Piskunov, 1989
Filatima frugalis (Braun, 1925)
Filatima fuliginea (Meyrick, 1929)
Filatima glycyrhizaeella (Chambers, 1877)
Filatima golovina Clarke, 1947
Filatima gomphopis (Meyrick, 1927)
Filatima hemicrossa (Meyrick, 1927)
Filatima incomptella (Herrich-Schaffer, 1854)
Filatima inquilinella (Busck, 1910)
Filatima isocrossa (Meyrick, 1927)
Filatima karsholti Ivinskis & Piskunov, 1989
Filatima kerzhneri Ivinskis & Piskunov, 1989
Filatima lapidescens (Meyrick, 1916)
Filatima loowita Adamski, 2009
Filatima monotaeniella (Bottimer, 1926)
Filatima natalis (Heinrich, 1920)
Filatima neotrophella (Heinrich, 1921)
Filatima nigripectus (Walsingham, 1911)
Filatima normifera (Meyrick, 1927)
Filatima nucifer (Walsingham, 1911)
Filatima obidenna Clarke, 1947
Filatima obscuroocelella (Chambers, 1875)
Filatima obscurosuffusella (Chambers, 1878)
Filatima occidua Hodges & Adamski, 1997
Filatima ochreosuffusella (Chambers, 1874)
Filatima ornatifimbriella (Clemens, 1864)
Filatima pagicola (Meyrick, 1936)
Filatima pallipalpella (Snellen, 1884)
Filatima perpensa Clarke, 1947
Filatima persicaeella (Murtfeldt, 1899)
Filatima platyochra Clarke, 1947
Filatima pravinominella (Chambers, 1878)
Filatima procedes Clarke, 1947
Filatima prognosticata (Braun, 1925)
Filatima pseudacaciella (Chambers, 1872)
Filatima revisensis Harrison & Berenbaum, 2013
Filatima rhypodes (Walsingham, 1911)
Filatima roceliella Clarke, 1942
Filatima saliciphaga (Keifer, 1937)
Filatima sciocrypta (Meyrick, 1936)
Filatima serotinella (Busck, 1903)
Filatima shastaella (Gaede, 1937)
Filatima sperryi Clarke, 1947
Filatima spinigera Clarke, 1947 
Filatima spurcella (Duponchel, 1843)
Filatima striatella (Busck, 1903)
Filatima tephrinopa (Meyrick, 1929)
Filatima tephritidella (Duponchel, 1844)
Filatima textorella (Chretien, 1908)
Filatima transsilvanella Z. Kovacs & S. Kovács, 2002
Filatima tridentata Clarke, 1947
Filatima ukrainica Piskunov, 1971
Filatima vaccinii Clarke, 1947
Filatima vaniae Clarke, 1947
Filatima xanthuris (Meyrick, 1927)
Filatima zagulajevi Anikin & Piskunov, 1996

References

 , 2009: A new Filatima Busck (Lepidoptera: Gelechiidae) associated with lupine and early herbivore colonization on mount St. Helens. Proc. Entomol. Soc. Washington 111 (2): 293-304.
 , 2001: A new species of Filatima Busck, 1939 (Lepidoptera, Gelechiidae) from Transylvania, Romania. Acta Zoologica Academiae Scientiarum Hungaricae 47 (4): 363–370.

 
Gelechiini
Moth genera